Nsuta is a small town and is the capital of Sekyere Central, a district in the Ashanti Region of Ghana. Nsuta is in Ashanti although there are a number of towns in Ghana with this name.

Transport 
This Nsuta is served by a station on the national railway network.
There is no railway station serving Asante-Nsuta.

Towns and villages under Asante-Nsuta Traditional Area
 Abaasua
 Abonkoso
 Aframso 
 Akyease 
 Amangoase
 Amuaman 
 Amugyewaa
 Anansu/Appiakrom
 Ankamadoa
 Asuafu
 Atwea
 Awanya
 Bimma
 Bonkron
 Dadease
 Danso
 Ɛkuo
 Gyansa
 Gyetiase 
 kↄtↄ Dida
 Kruwi
 Kwagyei
 Kyebi
 Kyeiase 
 Kyekyebon
 Mpantuase
 Mpempɛ
 Nkudwua 
 Nkwabrim
 Ohemaa Dida
 Pataase 
 Tadiɛso
 Tenten
 Twerefuo 
 Duamo
 Wuobuoho
There are also three major towns in the Sekyere Central District Assembly, Namely Sekyere-Beposo, Sekyere-Atonsu and Sekyere-Kwamang.

References 

Populated places in the Ashanti Region